Brett Claydon (born 11 October 1982) is an English professional darts player who plays in the Professional Darts Corporation (PDC) events.

He won a PDC Challenge Tour event in 2014.

References

External links

1982 births
Living people
English darts players
People from Soham
People from Newmarket, Suffolk
Professional Darts Corporation former tour card holders